Lars Gösta Haglund (born 22 May 1940) is a retired Swedish discus thrower who competed at the 1964 Summer Olympics. In 1965 he won the discus throw at the Summer Universiade and British AAA Athletics Championships. Haglund was the Swedish champion in the discus in 1962–66 and held multiple national records in this event.

References

1940 births
Living people
Swedish male discus throwers
Athletes (track and field) at the 1964 Summer Olympics
Olympic athletes of Sweden
Athletes from Stockholm
Universiade medalists in athletics (track and field)
Universiade gold medalists for Sweden
Medalists at the 1965 Summer Universiade